Volleyball competitions (beach and indoor) at the 2008 Summer Olympics in Beijing were held from 9 to 24 August 2008.  Indoor volleyball events were held at Capital Indoor Stadium and Beijing Institute of Technology Gymnasium.  Beach volleyball competitions were held from 9 to 22 August 2008 at the Beach Volleyball Ground at Chaoyang Park.

The 2008 Summer Olympics volleyball competitions brought the introduction of the new ball with a new moulding design making it more softened compared to the Mikasa MVP200.

Events
4 sets of medals were awarded in the following events:

Indoor volleyball – men (12 teams)
Indoor volleyball – women (12 teams)
Beach volleyball – men (24 teams)
Beach volleyball – women (24 teams)

Medal summary

Medal table

Medalists

See also
Volleyball at the 2008 Summer Paralympics

References

External links
Official Site of Beijing 2008 Olympics
Federation Internationale de Volleyball
Current Standing Olympic Beach Volleyball Qualification Women, Men
FIVB: The road to Beijing after the FIVB World Cup
Olympic Volleyball Tournaments matches schedule in Beijing for Men's and Women's are confirmed
Volleyball – Official Results Book
Beach Volleyball – Official Results Book

 
2008 Summer Olympics events
2008
O
O
International volleyball competitions hosted by China